Mike the Knight is a  CGI-animated children's television series created by Alexander Bar and written by Marc Seal. The series premiered in Treehouse TV in 2011.

Premise
The series is about Mike whose father, the King, is a knight who is away exploring other lands. Looking up to his father, Mike wants to be a knight too. However, he is still a knight-in-training. With his two dragon friends, Sparkie and Squirt; his sister, witch-in-training Evie; and his horse, Galahad, Mike tries to be the bravest knight of all. Throughout his adventures, he learns from the mistakes he makes—eventually realising, in every episode, how to 'be a knight—and do it right!'

Characters
 Mike is a knight-in-training who tries to be a brave knight like his father. He is voiced by Jake Beale, (later Trek Buccino) in North America and Benjamin Baker in the United Kingdom. Age: 8
Galahad is Mike's horse.
 Evie is Mike's younger sister. She is a witch-in-training and likes, whenever she can, to join Mike on his missions. Unfortunately, her magic always goes wrong - to disastrous but hilarious effect. She is voiced by Erin Pitt in North America and Jessica Hann in the United Kingdom.
Mr. Cuddles is Evie's pet frog and best friend.
 Sparkie is a big, red fire-breathing dragon who is one of Mike's sidekicks. He is voiced by Martin Roach in North America and Colin McFarlane in the United Kingdom.
 Squirt is a small, blue water-squirting dragon who is also one of Mike's sidekicks. He is voiced by Andrew Sabiston in North America and Russell Tovey in the United Kingdom.
 Flutter is Squirt's younger sister, and another water-squirting dragon. She doesn't appear much, but when she does it's usually with her mum and dad.
 Queen Martha is Mike and Evie's mother. She is "warm, wise, and caring". Voiced by Alyson Court in North America and Beth Chalmers in the United Kingdom.
Yip and Yap are corgis that Queen Martha owns.  Yip is a male who wears a blue collar and Yap is female (despite the two being called boys) with a red collar.The duo often run into trouble, usually caused by Mike's knightly interests or Evie's magic. Voiced by Robert Tinkler in both versions.
 The King is Martha's husband and the father of Mike and Evie. Absent in the earlier episodes on adventures, he recurs in multiple episodes in the third season.
 Fernando is the resident bard and his witty ditties begin and end each episode on a humorous note. He is voiced by Russell Trovey in the UK version and Scott McCord in North America.
 Trollee is a troll who is one of Mike's friends. He can be very shy sometimes, depending on the situation. He is voiced by Samantha Reynolds in the UK version and Nissae Isen in North America.
Mr. Troll is Trollee's father.
Mrs. Troll is Trollee's mother
 Richard and his younger brother Peter are companions.
 Edward is a knight-in-training from a different kingdom and Mike's rival.
 Robin & Marian are young children who sometimes help out.
 The Great Walforfini is an elderly wizard who sometimes teaches Evie.
 Mrs. Piecrust is a baker present in the opening who often produces pies and is a damsel that Mike rescues. She is voice by Sarah Carbanoose.
 Mr. Blacksmith as his name suggests, is the town blacksmith. A red-haired muscular man who in season 3 has a son who makes him a golden belt buckle for Father's Day.

Episodes

Broadcast
The series premiered on Treehouse TV in Canada on September 6, 2011, and CBeebies in the United Kingdom on November 29, 2011. The first Canadian season consisted of 26 episodes of 30 minutes (two fifteen-minute segments). The first British series was 53 segments while the second was 52.

It still airs on those channels along with Tiny Pop in the United Kingdom, Discovery Kids in Latin America, TF1 in France, ABC Kids in Australia, NPO Zappelin in the Netherlands, and TV2 in New Zealand.

In the United States, it aired on Nick Jr. from March 1, 2012 to November 30, 2018 and aired on Qubo from December 30, 2019 to December 4, 2020. It also aired in other languages including in Arabic on Spacetoon and in Welsh as 'Meic y Marchog' on S4C.

References

External links
 Mike the Knight on Treehouse TV
Mike the Knight on Nick Jr.
 Mike the Knight on CBeebies
 

2011 British television series debuts
2017 British television series endings
2011 Canadian television series debuts
2017 Canadian television series endings
2010s British animated television series
2010s British children's television series
2010s Canadian animated television series
2010s Canadian children's television series
British children's animated action television series
British children's animated adventure television series
British children's animated fantasy television series
British children's animated supernatural television series
British computer-animated television series
Canadian children's animated action television series
Canadian children's animated adventure television series
Canadian children's animated fantasy television series
Canadian children's animated supernatural television series
Canadian computer-animated television series
English-language television shows
Nick Jr. original programming
Treehouse TV original programming
Fictional explorers
British preschool education television series
Canadian preschool education television series
Animated preschool education television series
2010s preschool education television series
Television series by Mattel Creations
Television series by Nelvana
S4C original programming
Animated television series about children
Animated television series about dragons
Animated television series about horses
Television series set in the Middle Ages
CBeebies
HIT Entertainment
Fictional knights